Nyiakeng Puachue Hmong (RPA: Ntawv Nyiajkeeb Puajtxwm Hmoob) is an alphabet script devised for White Hmong and Green Hmong in the 1980s by Reverend Chervang Kong for use within his United Christians Liberty Evangelical Church.  The church, which moved around California, Minnesota, Wisconsin, North Carolina, Colorado, and many other states, has used the script in printed material and videos. It is reported to have some use in Laos, Thailand, Vietnam, France, and Australia.

The script bears strong resemblance to Thai script in structure and form and characters inspired from the Hebrew alphabet, although the characters themselves are different.  It contains 36 consonant characters, 9 vowel characters, and 7 combining tone characters.  There are also 5 characters for determinatives used to indicate that the preceding noun is the name of a person, place, thing, vertebrate or invertebrate animal, or a pet name for the animal. Determinatives are not pronounced, but help distinguish homophones. They appear as the last character in a word, and are not separated by a space.

Terminology 
The term Ntawv Nyiajkeeb Puajtxwm Hmoob means ‘Genesis Complete Hmong script’; ntawv means ‘letter’, nyiajkeeb means ‘genesis’, puajtxwm means ‘complete’, and hmoob is ‘Hmong’. The script is also called Hmong Kong Hmong, Pa Dao Hmong (also the name of a different Hmong script), and 'the Chervang script', after its inventor.

Consonants

Vowels

Tone markers

Noun indicators

Digits

Other symbols

Logograms

Unicode

Nyiakeng Puachue Hmong script was added to the Unicode Standard on March 5, 2019 with the release of version 12.0.

The Unicode block for Nyiakeng Puachue Hmong is U+1E100–U+1E14F:

Fonts
Nyiakeng-Puachue-Hmong-Fonts
Download Nyiakeng Puachue Hmong fonts

References

External links 
 Atlas of Endangered Alphabets - Nyiakeng Puachue Hmong
 Nyiakeng Puachue Hmong Keyboard
 Google Fonts Noto Serif Nyiakeng Puachue Hmong

Alphabets
Hmongic languages